Dixon Fiske (September 7, 1914 – June 22, 1970) was an American water polo player. He competed at the 1936 Summer Olympics and the 1948 Summer Olympics. In 1976, he was inducted into the USA Water Polo Hall of Fame.

References

External links
 

1914 births
1970 deaths
American male water polo players
Olympic water polo players of the United States
Water polo players at the 1936 Summer Olympics
Water polo players at the 1948 Summer Olympics
People from Yolo County, California